The Coxcomb Mountains are a mountain range located in eastern Riverside County, Southern California.

Geography
The Coxcomb Mountains are within the easternmost area of Joshua Tree National Park. They are east of the Eagle Mountains and Twentynine Palms, north of Interstate 10, and southeast of the Sheep Hole Mountains.

It is at GPS latitude—longitude coordinates of N 34.026279, W -115.404748.

Joshua Tree National Park
The Coxcomb Mountains are the most rugged and sharply perpendicular mountains within Joshua Tree National Park. Being in the park's wildest and least-visited northeastern corner, their relative isolation protects their wilderness habitat. There are trails to hike and explore the area.

The range is in the ecotone where habitats merge from the higher elevation Mojave Desert ecoregion and the lower elevation Colorado Desert of the Sonoran Desert ecoregion.

See also
Camp Coxcomb World War 2 training camp
 Flora of the California desert regions
 List of Sonoran Desert wildflowers
 Mountain ranges of the Colorado Desert
 Mountain ranges of the Mojave Desert

References

 California Road and Recreation Atlas, 2005, pg. 113

External links
 Official Joshua Tree National Park website
 Bird Checklists for Joshua Tree National Park

Mountain ranges of the Mojave Desert
Mountain ranges of the Colorado Desert
Mountain ranges of Riverside County, California
Mountain ranges of Southern California
Joshua Tree National Park
Protected areas of Riverside County, California
Protected areas of the Mojave Desert